One Big Affair is a 1952 American comedy film directed by Peter Godfrey and written by Leo Townsend and Francis Swann. The film stars Evelyn Keyes, Dennis O'Keefe, Mary Anderson, Connie Gilchrist, Thurston Hall and Gus Schilling. The film was released on February 22, 1952 by United Artists.

Plot

A teacher from Pomona, California and two friends are vacationing in Mexico. By lingering too long in a Mexico City gift shop, Jean Harper accidentally gets left behind.

Jimmy Donovan, a lawyer from the U.S., is on his way to Acapulco to handle the divorce of a wealthy woman, her fifth. He decides to ride a bicycle from Mexico City and ends up encountering Jean, whose friends and tour guide fear she's a kidnap victim.

Jean tags along on the bike, hearing the kidnap report on the radio but not telling Jimmy about it. When police confront him, Jimmy and Jean pretend to be newlyweds and take the bridal suite when the cops keep observing them. An orphan boy, Juanito, befriends them and wants to be adopted. He eventually gets his wish when Jimmy and Jean straighten things out.

Cast 
Evelyn Keyes as Jean Harper
Dennis O'Keefe as Jimmy Donovan
Mary Anderson as Hilda Jones	
Connie Gilchrist as Miss Marple 
Thurston Hall as Mr. 'G'
Gus Schilling as Mr. Rush
José Torvay as Charcoal Wagon Driver
Charles Musqued as Police Chief
Andrés Velázquez as Orphan Boy

References

External links 
 

1952 films
1952 comedy films
1950s American films
1950s comedy road movies
1950s English-language films
American black-and-white films
American comedy road movies
Films about vacationing
Films directed by Peter Godfrey
Films set in Mexico City
United Artists films